A Short Story About a War is the fifth studio album by Canadian rapper Shad, released in Canada on October 26, 2018.

Background
A Short Story About a War is a concept album focused around The Fool in a war controlled by the Snipers, Revolutionaries, the Establishment, and the Stone-Throwers, described as "holding a mirror to our world – a provocative story told through disarmingly catchy songs that weaves through issues of migration, environment, politics and above all, the human spirit."

Singles
He had released the singles for this album "The Fool Pt. 1 (Get it Got it Good)" on July 26, 2018, along with a music video, "The Fool Pt. 3 (State of Mind)" on August 29, 2018, along with a music video, and the song "The Stone Throwers (Gone in a Blink)" on September 26, 2018.

Critical reception

A Short Story about a War has received generally positive review from critics. Eric Lowers from Exclaim! said, "Shad's A Short Story About a War isn't a one-listen album, but rather one with multiple layers that need to be peeled back to fully grasp its concept.". The Spill Magazine declared the album for Editor's Picks and Nicholas Musilli states that, "A Short Story About A War delivers the raw reality of injustice, greed, and racism in our present time and space. Shad's sixth studio album stands out as collage of expressionism, a mixed-media of sorts." and that "A Short Story About A War delivers in the most uncomfortable way, while difficult at times, it speaks an honest emotional truth." In July 2019, A Short Story about a War was shortlisted for the 2019 Polaris Music Prize.

Track listing

Personnel
The following personnel are the known album contributors:

 Tim "2oolman" Hill
 Eternia
 Ian Kamau
 Kaytranada
 Steven Mulcare
 Lido Pimienta
 DJ T Lo.
 Yukon Blonde
 Paul Chin

References

External links
 

2018 albums
Shad (rapper) albums
Secret City Records albums